Thiobenzoic acid is an organosulfur compound with molecular formula C6H5COSH. It is the parent of aryl thiocarboxylic acids.  It is a pale yellow liquid that freezes just below room temperature.

Thiobenzoic acid is prepared by treatment of benzoyl chloride with potassium hydrosulfide:
C6H5C(O)Cl + KSH → C6H5C(O)SH + KCl

Acidity
With a pKa near 2.5, this acid is almost 100x more acidic than benzoic acid.  The conjugate base is thiobenzoate, C6H5COS−.

See also
 Dithiobenzoic acid

References

Benzoic acids